The 2016 KNVB Cup Final was a football match between Feyenoord and FC Utrecht on 24 April 2016 at De Kuip, Rotterdam. It was the final match of the 2015–16 KNVB Cup competition and the 98th Dutch Cup Final. Feyenoord beat Utrecht 2–1 to win their first domestic cup since 2008 and their 12th in total.

Route to the final

Match

Details

References

2016
2015–16 in Dutch football
Feyenoord matches
FC Utrecht matches
April 2016 sports events in Europe
Sports competitions in Rotterdam
21st century in Rotterdam